Sinasian Sign Language (SSSL) is a village sign language of the Sinasina valley in Chimbu Province, Papua New Guinea. This language is used by approximately 3 deaf and 50 hearing individuals, including members of the Kere community. SSSL was first encountered and reported by linguists in 2016. Documentation efforts are ongoing.

Sinasina Sign Language may have lexical similarities with another village sign language in the region, Kailge Sign Language., but its genetic affiliation has yet to be established.

See also
Sinasina language

References

Village sign languages
Sign languages of Papua New Guinea